Elections in Khyber Pakhtunkhwa, a province of Pakistan are conducted in accordance with the Constitution of Pakistan. The Assembly of Khyber Pakhtunkhwa creates laws regarding the conduct of local body elections unilaterally while any changes by the Provincial Assembly to the conduct of Provincial elections need to be approved by the Parliament of Pakistan. Election Commission of Pakistan is responsible of conducting Elections in Khyber Pakhtunkhwa.

Khyber Pakhtunkhwa is Represented by 55 MNA's in National Assembly which include 45 General Seats and 10 Women Seats. In Senate of Pakistan Khyber Pakhtunkhwa is Represented by 23 Senators which include 14 General Seats, 4 Technocrat/Ulema Seats, 4 Women Seats, and 1 Seat for Non-Muslims.

Provincial Assembly of Khyber Pakhtunkhwa is the unicameral legislature of Khyber Pakhtunkhwa. Khyber Pakhtunkhwa Assembly consists of 145 Members which include 115 General Seats, 26 Women Seats, and 4 Non-Muslim Seats.

Political Parties
Pakistan Tehreek-e-Insaf (PTI) is the major political party in Khyber Pakhtunkhwa. Jamiat Ulema-e-Islam(F), Awami National Party are minor political parties of the Province. Pakistan Muslim League Nawaz (PML-N) Jamat-e-Islami (JI) and Pakistan People's Party (PPP) also has minor support in the Province.

General Elections

Provincial Elections

References